Bulan Airport is an airport serving the municipality of Bulan in the province of Sorsogon, Philippines. The airport is classified as a feeder or community airport by the Civil Aviation Authority of the Philippines, a body of the Department of Transportation that is responsible for the operations of not only this airport but also of all other airports in the Philippines except the major international airports.

References

Airports in the Philippines